Vyacheslav Viktorovych  Hrozny (born 12 July 1956) is a Ukrainian football player and manager.

Career
He is a holder of the 1980 KFK Cup of the Ukrainian SSR as a player of FC Nyva Ternopil when it used to play in Pidhaitsi.

Hrozny is a graduate of the Lutsk Pedagogical Institute and the Higher School of Coaches in Moscow. Since the late 1980s coached number of clubs in post-Soviet countries. Until his appointment with Dnipro Dnipropetrovsk in the mid-1990s, Hrozny coached as an assistant to a head coach. In 1997, he was suspended from coaching in Ukraine and moved abroad. Hrozny returned in 2002 after being appointed as a coach of the newly formed club Arsenal Kyiv. But he did not stay in Ukraine for too long and in 2008 Hrozny left again to coach Terek Grozny and FC Tobol.

On 30 December 2019, Hroznyi was announced as the new manager of Shakhter Karagandy. On 17 June 2020, Hroznyi's contract was terminated by mutual consent.

Managerial statistics

Achievements
 Merited Coach of Ukraine
 Merited Coach of Russia
 Runner-up of the Bulgarian League (Levski Sofia)
 Finalist of the Ukrainian Cup (Dnipro Dnipropetrovsk)
 Order of Merit (Ukraine) (2004)

External links
  Profile by Footballfacts

References

1956 births
Living people
FC Nyva Ternopil players
Lutsk Pedagogical Institute alumni
Higher School of Coaches alumni
Ukrainian footballers
Ukrainian football managers
Soviet football managers
Ukrainian Premier League managers
FC Nyva Vinnytsia managers
FC Dnipro managers
PFC Levski Sofia managers
FC Arsenal Kyiv managers
FC Metalurh Zaporizhzhia managers
FC Akhmat Grozny managers
FC Tobol managers
FC Hoverla Uzhhorod managers
Russian Premier League managers
Expatriate football managers in Bulgaria
Expatriate football managers in Russia
Merited Coaches of Ukraine
Ukrainian expatriate football managers
Ukrainian expatriate sportspeople in Russia
Ukrainian expatriate sportspeople in Bulgaria
Honoured Coaches of Russia
Expatriate football managers in Kazakhstan
Ukrainian expatriate sportspeople in Kazakhstan
FC Dinamo Tbilisi managers
Expatriate football managers in Georgia (country)
Ukrainian expatriate sportspeople in Georgia (country)
FC Irtysh Pavlodar managers
Association football midfielders
Soviet footballers
Sportspeople from Khmelnytskyi Oblast